Dixella is a genus of meniscus midges in the family Dixidae. There are more than 70 described species in Dixella.

Species
These 73 species belong to the genus Dixella:

 Dixella aegyptiaca Wagner, Freidberg & Ortal, 1992
 Dixella aestivalis (Meigen, 1818)
 Dixella alexanderi Peters, 1970
 Dixella amphibia (De Geer, 1776)
 Dixella andeana (Lane, 1942)
 Dixella argentina (Alexander, 1920)
 Dixella atra (Lane, 1942)
 Dixella attica (Pandazis, 1933)
 Dixella aurora Peters & Cook, 1966
 Dixella autumnalis (Meigen, 1838)
 Dixella bankowskae (Vaillant, 1969)
 Dixella californica Johannsen, 1923
 Dixella campinosica (Tarwid, 1938)
 Dixella chapadensis (Lane, 1939)
 Dixella clavulus (Williston, 1896)
 Dixella cornuta Johannsen, 1923
 Dixella cumbrica Peters & Cook, 1966
 Dixella curvistylus Greenwalt & Moulton, 2016
 Dixella deltoura Peters & Cook, 1966
 Dixella dorsalis
 Dixella eomarginata Greenwalt & Moulton, 2016
 Dixella fernandezae Chaverri & Borkent, 2007
 Dixella filicornis (Edwards, 1926)
 Dixella fuscinervis (Tonnoir, 1924)
 Dixella goetghebueri (Seguy, 1921)
 Dixella golanensis Wagner, Freidberg & Ortal, 1992
 Dixella graeca (Pandazis, 1937)
 Dixella hansoni Chaverri & Borkent, 2007
 Dixella harrisi (Tonnoir, 1925)
 Dixella harrisoni (Freeman, 1956)
 Dixella hernandezi Chaverri & Borkent, 2007
 Dixella horrmani (Lane, 1942)
 Dixella humeralis (Tonnoir, 1923)
 Dixella hyperborea (Bergroth, 1889)
 Dixella intacta Greenwalt & Moulton, 2016
 Dixella israelis Wagner, Freidberg & Ortal, 1992
 Dixella jironi Chaverri & Borkent, 2007
 Dixella laeta (Loew, 1849)
 Dixella limai (Santos, 1940)
 Dixella lirio (Dyar & Shannon, 1924)
 Dixella lobata Chaverri & Borkent, 2007
 Dixella maculata Chaverri & Borkent, 2007
 Dixella marginata (Loew, 1863)
 Dixella martinii (Peus, 1934)
 Dixella monticola (Nielsen, 1937)
 Dixella neozelandica (Tonnoir, 1924)
 Dixella nicholsoni (Tonnoir, 1923)
 Dixella nigra (Staeger, 1840)
 Dixella nixiae Peters, 1980
 Dixella nova Walker, 1948
 Dixella obscura (Loew, 1849)
 Dixella paulistana (Lane, Forattini & Rabello, 1955)
 Dixella peruviana (Edwards, 1931)
 Dixella pilosiflagellata Papp, 2007
 Dixella scitula Belkin & al.
 Dixella serotina (Meigen, 1818)
 Dixella shannoni (Lane, 1942)
 Dixella simiarum (Vaillant, 1959)
 Dixella solomonis Belkin, 1962
 Dixella spinilobata Greenwalt & Moulton, 2016
 Dixella subobscura (Takahashi, 1958)
 Dixella suzukii Chaverri & Borkent, 2007
 Dixella tasmaniensis (Tonnoir, 1923)
 Dixella techana Peters & Cook, 1966
 Dixella tonnoiri (Belkin, 1968)
 Dixella torrentia Lane, 1939
 Dixella trinitensis Lane, 1943
 Dixella unipunctata (Tonnoir, 1923)
 Dixella venezuelensis (Lane, 1942)
 Dixella verna (Vaillant, 1969)
 Dixella vespertina Peters & Cook, 1966
 Dixella woodi Chaverri & Borkent, 2007
 Dixella wygodzinskyi (Lane, 1945)

References

Further reading

 

Dixidae
Articles created by Qbugbot
Culicomorpha genera